The 1971 LFF Lyga was the 50th season of the LFF Lyga football competition in Lithuania.  It was contested by 16 teams, and Pazanga Vilnius won the championship.

League standings

References
RSSSF

LFF Lyga seasons
1971 in Lithuania
LFF